The 2000 season was the Dallas Cowboys' 41st in the National Football League (NFL). Cowboys owner Jerry Jones promoted the team's long-time defensive coordinator, Dave Campo, to be the fifth head coach of the Dallas Cowboys. This was also Troy Aikman's last season with the team.

Offseason 
The loss of star wide receiver Michael Irvin to retirement led Jerry Jones to trade the team's first round pick in the 2000 draft and the 2001 draft to the Seattle Seahawks for wide receiver Joey Galloway. Pro Bowl cornerback Deion Sanders was also released after five seasons with the team. He later signed with the Cowboys' NFC East division rival Washington Redskins. Fullback Daryl Johnston also retired after the 1999 season.

2000 draft class 

Notes
 The Cowboys traded their 2000 and 2001 first-round selections to the Seattle Seahawks for wide receiver Joey Galloway.
 The Cowboys traded their third-round selection to the Seattle Seahawks for wide receiver James McKnight.

Undrafted free agents

Regular season 
After a lackluster draft which saw the team draft three cornerbacks to replace the departure of star cornerback Deion Sanders, the Dave Campo head coaching era had an inauspicious start with an embarrassing blow-out defeat to the Philadelphia Eagles at home (in which the Eagles recovered an onside kick on the opening kickoff). The loss proved to be even more costly as quarterback Troy Aikman suffered a serious concussion early in the game and newly acquired wide receiver Joey Galloway suffered a season-ending injury in the fourth quarter.

New faces like veteran quarterback Randall Cunningham and wide receiver James McKnight filled in on offense under new offensive coordinator Jack Reilly. On defense, the loss of both starting cornerbacks in the off-season required the addition of veterans Phillipi Sparks and Ryan McNeil. Combined with perennial Pro Bowl safety Darren Woodson, the Cowboys fielded one of the NFL's best secondaries. Unfortunately, a leaky run defense and an inconsistent, aging offense led to a 5–11 record.

In a blow-out loss to the San Francisco 49ers, then controversial 49ers wide receiver Terrell Owens caused an uproar by celebrating a touchdown on the large Cowboys star at midfield in Texas Stadium, prompting anger and resentment off the field. This prompted a retaliation by running back Emmitt Smith with a famous "Defend the Star" kneel-down celebration of his own on the star. When Owens scored his second touchdown and promptly celebrated in midfield once more, then-safety George Teague knocked Owens off and a short brawl ensued on the field. Owens immediately returned to the star to celebrate while the brawl ensued. Teague was ejected from the game, and Terrell Owens was suspended for the next game. Ironically, Owens became a Cowboy later in his career.

Emmitt Smith's tenth consecutive 1,000-yard season (an NFL record), along with a season sweep of the rival Washington Redskins, proved to be the only highlights in an otherwise disappointing season.

The Cowboys finished 31st in the league in run defense that season, allowing 164.8 yards per game and 4.9 yards per carry.

Notable additions to the team include future starting cornerback Mario Edwards, as well as Dwayne Goodrich. Goodrich gained notoriety after being involved in a hit and run accident which resulted in the deaths of two people. He was subsequently convicted of criminally negligent homicide.

Backup running back Chris Warren was released after a 27-7 loss to the Tampa Bay Buccaneers. Warren tipped a pass which was intercepted by Brian Kelly and returned for a touchdown. After the play Warren was benched, he exchanged words with assistant coaches and spent the rest of the game on the sideline sulking. He was released a few days later and was replaced by rookie Michael Wiley, Warren would eventually sign with the Philadelphia Eagles for the remainder of the season.

Schedule 

Note: Intra-division opponents are in bold text.

Standings

Roster

Publications 
The Football Encyclopedia 
Total Football 
Cowboys Have Always Been My Heroes

References

External links 
 2000 Dallas Cowboys
 Pro Football Hall of Fame
 Dallas Cowboys Official Site

Dallas Cowboys seasons
Dallas
Dallas